Andrea Hasler is a contemporary artist born in Zürich, Switzerland in 1975. She received her MFA from Chelsea College of Art and Design in London, UK in 2002 and currently lives and works in London, UK. Her works typically use wax to create objects that appear to be made from meat, simulating objects including purses and tents.

Hasler's wax and mixed media sculptures are characterized by a tension between attraction and repulsion, and highly influenced by artists John Isaacs, Berlinde De Bruyckere and Louise Bourgeois. Her 2013 solo exhibition Burdens of Excess re-fashioned high-end designer accessories into bulging globs of pink wax studded with brand-name zipper pulls, insignias, straps and handles.

In 2014, Hasler won the Greenham Common Commission and created a new work, The Matriarch, that took Greenham Common’s history as a starting point, focusing on the Women’s Peace Camp. This work was filmed by BBC for The Culture Show. Hasler also participated in the 3-D Foundation Artist Residency in the mountain town of Verbier, Switzerland creating two site-specific sculptures for the exhibition MUTATIONS: Contemporary Sculpture in Context, curated by Paul Goodwin.

Hasler's solo exhibitions include New Greenham Arts, Newbury, UK; GUSFORD, Los Angeles, Los Angeles, CA, USA; Next Level Projects, London, UK; and Artrepco Gallery, Zürich, Switzerland. Her work was also featured in the 2014 publication The Language of Mixed-Media Sculpture by Jac Scott.

References

External links

Interview with Vice

1975 births
Living people
Alumni of the University of the Arts London
Swiss women sculptors
21st-century Swiss sculptors
21st-century Swiss women artists